Zagipa Yakhyakyzy Baliyeva (born on 3 October 1958, in the Raiymbek District, Kazakh SSR, USSR) is a female Kazakh politician who served as the Minister of Justice of Kazakhstan starting from 13 April 2006 until 2009. Baliyeva previously served as the Chairwoman of the Central Electoral Commission from 1996 until 13 April, when Onalsyn Zhumabekov replaced her and she became the Minister of Justice. She became a member of Otan political party on 30 May 2006.

Biography 

Her maiden surname is "Isakova"

Zagipa Balieva was born on 3 October 1958, in the village of Jalanash, Kegen District, Almaty Region.

She began her career as a laboratory assistant at a vocational school, having worked in this institution from 1975 to 1976.

In 1981 she graduated from the Kazakh State University named after Kirov, specializing as a lawyer.

From 1986 to 1992 she was the head of the department for accounting and distribution of living space of the Almaty City Executive Committee.

Then, from 1992 to 1994 took up the post of the Head of the Legal Department of the Office of the Head of the Almaty City Administration.

Was the Deputy of the Supreme Council of the Republic of Kazakhstan of the XIII convocation in 1994–1995, also worked as deputy chairman of the Committee of the Supreme Council of the Republic of Kazakhstan on economic reform.

In March 1995, Zagipa was a Secretary, then since January 1996 worked as the Chairman of the Central Election Commission of the Republic of Kazakhstan.

9 years, from 1996 to 2005, she worked as a senior chairman of the Central Election Commission of the Republic of Kazakhstan.

From April 2005 to 2 April 2009 Zagipa coped with the post of the Minister of Justice of the Republic of Kazakhstan.

From 3 April 2009 to 10 January 2021, she was the Deputy of the Mazhilis, Member of the Committee on Legislation and Judicial and Legal Reform of the Mazhilis of the Parliament of the Republic of Kazakhstan. 

Also from 25 March 2016 to 12 June 2018, she was the ombudsman for the rights of the children in the Republic of Kazakhstan.

From 10 March 2021, she is working as Vice-Rector of the Kazakh National Agrarian Research University in Almaty.

Party affiliation 

She is a member of the Political Council of the "Nur Otan" Party (from 07.2006)

Education 

First, she graduated from Kazakh State University named after S.M. Kirov in 1981, where she got the speciality of "Lawyer". 

Then, from Kazakh Economic University named after T.Ryskulova, she got her second speciality of "International economist".

Family 
She is married (her husband – Baliev Mukhtar Abzalovich), has four sons (Daniyar, Ernar, Aliyar, Nursultan), and two daughters (Aldara, Daria).

Her husband, Baliev Mukhtar Abzalovich, has been running a small business called an LLC "OASIS TAU ALMATY" since 2006. 

Her eldest son Daniyar is the head of "DL Construction" LLP, which is filing claims for allegedly violated rights of "Kcell", as well as cable TV operators. Also, Daniyar is trying to force Kazakh radio stations to pay twice for the broadcast of foreign songs.

Scientific publications 

1. The criterion of democracy (Z. Baliyeva, deputy of the Mazhilis of the Parliament of the Republic of Kazakhstan)

2. Zagipa Baliyeva: "Kazgugrad grew before my eyes"

3. "The people and the state are inseparable" (Z. Baliyeva, Minister of Justice of the Republic of Kazakhstan)

4. Zagipa Baliyeva: "Observance of measure in everything is the art of the politician."

See also
Government of Kazakhstan

References

External links
Kazakh electoral chief rules out vote rigging
Kazakh Minister of Justice Zagipa Baliyeva appointed two Vice Ministers
Nazarbayev wins presidential election in Kazakhstan

1959 births
Living people
Fatherland (Kazakhstan) politicians
Government ministers of Kazakhstan
Members of the Mazhilis
Women government ministers of Kazakhstan
20th-century Kazakhstani women politicians
20th-century Kazakhstani politicians
21st-century Kazakhstani women politicians
21st-century Kazakhstani politicians